David Carneiro Dias Resende Bruno (born 14 February 1992 in Porto) is a Portuguese professional footballer who plays for Moreirense F.C. as a right-back.

References

External links

1992 births
Living people
Portuguese footballers
Footballers from Porto
Association football defenders
Primeira Liga players
Liga Portugal 2 players
FC Porto players
C.D. Trofense players
FC Porto B players
S.C. Freamunde players
C.D. Tondela players
G.D. Estoril Praia players
Moreirense F.C. players
Liga I players
FC Astra Giurgiu players
Portugal youth international footballers
Portugal under-21 international footballers
Portuguese expatriate footballers
Expatriate footballers in Romania
Portuguese expatriate sportspeople in Romania